Rucker may refer to:

People
 Rucker (surname)

Places

United States
 Rucker Park, street basketball court in Manhattan, New York City, New York
 Rucker, California, an historic district in unincorporated Santa Clara County, California
 Rucker, Missouri
 Rucker, Texas

See also
 
 
 Ruckers, Flemish family of harpsichord makers
 Ruck (disambiguation)